Book of Kings may refer to:

 The Books of Kings in the Bible
 The Shahnama, an 11th-century epic Persian poem
 The Pararaton, the Javanese Book of Kings, a 16th-century Javanese history of southeast Asia
 The Book of Kings, a 1999 World War II novel by James Thackara
 The Book of Kings, a 2011 funeral doom metal album by Mournful Congregation

See also 
 King's Book
 Book of shu-king